The 2023 Georgia State Panthers football team will represent Georgia State University as a member of the Sun Belt Conference during the 2023 NCAA Division I FBS football season. The Panthers were led by seventh-year head coach Shawn Elliott and played their home games at Center Parc Stadium in Atlanta.

Previous season

The Panthers finished the 2022 season with an 4–8 overall record and 3–5 in Sun Belt play.

Schedule
The football schedule was announced February 24, 2023.

References

Georgia State
Georgia State Panthers football seasons
Georgia State Panthers football